The Baoneng Center is a supertall skyscraper in Shenzhen, Guangdong, China. Construction started in 2014 and was completed in 2018.

The architecture firm Aedas designed Baoneng Center for Baoneng Group.

See also
List of tallest buildings in Shenzhen
List of tallest buildings in China

References

Buildings and structures under construction in China
Skyscraper office buildings in Shenzhen